Dávid Kondrlík (born 31 May 1997) is a Slovak football forward who currently plays for Sokol Lanžhot.

Club career

FC DAC 1904 Dunajská Streda
Kondrlík made his Fortuna Liga debut for DAC Dunajská Streda against Spartak Myjava on 2 August 2016.

References

External links
 FC DAC 1904 Dunajská Streda official club profile
 
 Futbalnet profile
 OEFB profile

1997 births
Living people
Footballers from Bratislava
Slovak footballers
Slovak expatriate footballers
Slovakia youth international footballers
Association football forwards
FC DAC 1904 Dunajská Streda players
OFK Dunajská Lužná players
FC Petržalka players
FK Pohronie players
TJ Sokol Lanžhot players
Slovak Super Liga players
2. Liga (Slovakia) players
3. Liga (Slovakia) players
Czech Fourth Division players
Austrian Regionalliga players
Expatriate footballers in Austria
Slovak expatriate sportspeople in Austria
Expatriate footballers in the Czech Republic
Slovak expatriate sportspeople in the Czech Republic